Count Alexander Konstantin Albrecht von Mensdorff-Pouilly, 1st Prince von Dietrichstein zu Nikolsburg (4 August 1813 in Coburg – 14 February 1871) was an Austrian general, diplomat and politician, including two years as Minister of Foreign Affairs (1864–66) and one month's service as Minister-President of Austria. He was a cousin of Queen Victoria of the United Kingdom of Great Britain and Ireland.

Life and career
He was born as a son of Princess Sophie of Saxe-Coburg-Saalfeld and Count Emmanuel von Mensdorff-Pouilly, a member of the House of Mensdorff-Pouilly. He entered the Austrian army in 1829, and he was promoted to captain in 1836 and major in 1844. In 1848–49, he fought in the First Italian War of Independence and against the Hungarian Revolution of 1848. In 1849, he was promoted to colonel and the following year to major general.

In 1851, Mensdorff-Pouilly was appointed as the Austrian commissioner to Schleswig-Holstein. In 1852, he became the Austrian ambassador to Russia. He was promoted to Feldmarschallleutnant in 1858. During the Polish Uprising of 1863, he served as the governor of Austrian Galicia.

Foreign Minister 
Mensdorff-Pouilly was appointed as Foreign Minister of the Austrian Empire on 27 October 1864. Mensdorff-Pouilly's policies during his tenure as Foreign Minister for Emperor Franz Joseph were often largely a continuation of the conservative traditionalism of Count Johann von Rechberg und Rothenlöwen, his predecessor.

Mensdorff-Pouilly, like Rechberg, sought to maintain conservative dominance of the German Confederation through an alliance between Austria and Prussia (in which Prussia was the junior partner), and he steadfastly refused to consider British suggestions that Austria surrender Venetia to Italy.

After Austria's defeat in the Austro-Prussian War of 1866, Mensdorff-Pouilly resigned his functions in November of that year. After his resignation, he was appointed commanding general in Zagreb and Prague.

Family 
He married Alexandrine "Aline" von Dietrichstein-Proskau-Leslie (1824–1906), daughter of Joseph, 9th Prince von Dietrichstein (1798–1858), with whom he had children:
 Marie Gabriele von Mensdorff-Pouilly-Dietrichstein (1858–1889) 
 Hugo, 2nd Prince von Dietrichstein zu Nikolsburg (1858–1920), married Princess Olga Alexandrovna Dolgorukova (1873 - 1946) in 1892
 Count Albert von Mensdorff-Pouilly-Dietrichstein
 Clotilde von Mensdorff-Pouilly-Dietrichstein, married Count Albert Apponyi in 1897

References 

1813 births
1871 deaths
19th-century Ministers-President of Austria
19th-century Czech people
Austro-Hungarian politicians
Austrian Empire politicians
Foreign ministers of Austria
Ministers-President of Austria
Counts of Germany
Counts of Austria
Alexander
Austrian people of German descent
Bohemian nobility
People from Coburg
Politicians from Prague
Alexander
Governors of the Kingdom of Galicia and Lodomeria
Knights Cross of the Military Order of Maria Theresa
Grand Crosses of the Order of Saint Stephen of Hungary
Grand Crosses of the Order of the Dannebrog